Ilija Ivezić (20 July 1926 – 14 April 2016) was a Croatian film actor. He was born in Ričice, Gračac and died shortly before his 90th birthday. In a career that spanned more than five decades, Ivezić worked with directors such as Fadil Hadžić, Krsto Papić, Vatroslav Mimica, Antun Vrdoljak, Veljko Bulajić, and Antun Vrdoljak, among many others.

Selected filmography
 Last of the Renegades (1964)
 Die Rechnung – eiskalt serviert (1966)
 Winnetou and Old Firehand (1966)
 The Bloody Vultures of Alaska (1973)
 A Performance of Hamlet in the Village of Mrdusa Donja (1974)
 The Golden Years (1993)
 Marshal Tito's Spirit (1999)

References

External links

1926 births
2016 deaths
People from Gračac
Croatian male film actors
Vladimir Nazor Award winners
Golden Arena winners